Kevin Marshall (born 12 January 1973) is a Canadian speed skater. He competed at the 1998 Winter Olympics and the 2002 Winter Olympics.

References

External links
 

1973 births
Living people
Canadian male speed skaters
Olympic speed skaters of Canada
Speed skaters at the 1998 Winter Olympics
Speed skaters at the 2002 Winter Olympics
Sportspeople from Victoria, British Columbia
21st-century Canadian people